Jay Taylor (born 16 October 1983) is an English actor. He is best known for the role of Marcus in the 2008 British Thriller film Donkey Punch.

Early life and education 
Taylor was born in Bromley, the son of a BBC TV producer. His brother is a 1st assistant director and fashion / photo journalism photographer. He was educated at the Ravens Wood School for Boys in Bromley. He then went on to train at The Royal Academy of Dramatic Art (RADA), graduating in 2006.
Taylor lives in London.

Career 
Taylor´s acting career began in 2007 when he appeared as Jonathan Fox in the BBC TV series, Holby City and then portrayed Evan Davies in the TV film, Daphne. In the same year he was cast as drug dealer Chris Wrightman in the English crime film, Rise of the Footsoldier, based on the life of former Inter City Firm football hooligan turned underworld gang member, Carlton Leach. In 2008 Taylor co-starred alongside Jaime Winstone, Julian Morris, Nichola Burley, Robert Boulter, Sian Breckin and Tom Burke in Olly Blackburn´s directoral debut, Donkey Punch, playing the role of Marcus. Donkey Punch was critically honoured at its appearance at the Sundance Film Festival.

In the same year, Taylor also played the recurring role of Dan Cox in a number of episodes in the ITV production of The Bill, and in The Fixer. Taylor appeared in series 3 of Misfits. Jay has also appeared in: George Lucas' second world war epic 'Red Tails'; the Glasgow Citizens Theatre production of 'A Clockwork Orange'; BBC4's Mills & Boon biopic 'Consuming Passion'; the Channel 4 comedy 'Sirens'; BBC comedy 'Teaboys; and in 'A Fantastic Fear Of Everything'. Taylor has also directed three short films, Homecoming, Laura and London Bridge.

References

External links 

Jay Taylor at United Agents

English male film actors
English male soap opera actors
1983 births
Living people
Male actors from London
People from Bromley